Young as You Feel is a 1931 American pre-Code comedy film directed by Frank Borzage and starring Will Rogers, Fifi D'Orsay and Lucien Littlefield. The story was later remade by Fox in 1940 under the same title as part of the Jones Family series of films.

Cast

 Will Rogers as Lemuel Morehouse 
 Fifi D'Orsay as Fleurette  
 Lucien Littlefield as Noah Marley  
 Don Dillaway as Billy Morehouse  
 Terrance Ray as Tom Morehouse 
 Lucile Browne as Dorothy Gregson  
 Rosalie Roy as Rose Gregson  
 Gregory Gaye as Pierre
 John T. Murray as Colonel Stanhope  
 Brandon Hurst as Robbins  
 C. Henry Gordon as Harry Lamson  
 Marcia Harris as Mrs. Denton  
 Otto Hoffman as Secretary  
 Joan Standing as Lemuel's Secretary 
 Bob Burns as Colorado Detective  
 Eddy Chandler as Death of a Faun Picket  
 Harvey Clark as Colorado Hotel Manager  
 Charles Coleman as Butler 
 Paul Fix as Desk Clerk  
 Tom Kennedy as Colorado Detective 
 Cecilia Parker as Undetermined Role  
 James Pierce as Jack, a Cop

References

Bibliography
 Goble, Alan. The Complete Index to Literary Sources in Film. Walter de Gruyter, 1999.

External links
 

1931 films
1931 comedy films
1930s English-language films
American comedy films
Films directed by Frank Borzage
Fox Film films
American black-and-white films
1930s American films